Andrei Blaier (15 May 1933 – 1 December 2011) was a Romanian film director and screenwriter. His 1958 film The Ball was entered into the 1st Moscow International Film Festival.

Born in Bucharest, he graduated in 1956 from the I.L. Caragiale Institute of Theatre and Film Arts.

Blaier was awarded the National Order of Faithful Service, Knight rank. He died in 2011 in Bucharest and was buried at the Bellu Catholic Cemetery.

Selected filmography

Director 
 Ora "H" (1956) 
 Prima melodie (1958)
 The Ball (Mingea, 1958)
 Furtuna (1960) 
 A fost prietenul meu (1962)
 Casa neterminată (1964)
  (1967)
 Apoi s-a născut legenda (1968)
 Vilegiatura (1971)
 Pădurea pierdută (1971) 
  (TV series, 1972)
  (1975) 
 Through the Ashes of the Empire (Prin cenușa imperiului, 1976/1978) 
 Urgia (1977)
  (1977) 
  (1978)
 Lumini și umbre (1979–1982)
 Întunericul alb (1982)
  (1984) 
  (1985)
 Bătălia din umbră (1986)
 Vacanța cea mare (1988) 
 Dreptatea (1989)
 Momentul adevărului (1989) 
  (1992)
  (1993)
  (1995)
 Dulcea saună a morții (2003)

References

External links

1933 births
2011 deaths
Romanian film directors
Film people from Bucharest
Caragiale National University of Theatre and Film alumni
Burials at Bellu Cemetery
Recipients of the National Order of Faithful Service